Niedary may refer to the following places in Poland:
Niedary, Lower Silesian Voivodeship (south-west Poland)
Niedary, Lesser Poland Voivodeship (south Poland)